George Searle may refer to:
 George Mary Searle, American astronomer and Catholic priest
 George Frederick Charles Searle, British physicist and teacher